Aaron Richard Baskin (born December 1, 1948) is an American film composer and producer, best known as the writer of several songs for the Robert Altman film Nashville, and other creative film scores in the 1970s and 1980s. He eventually became a film director, directing music videos with Barbra Streisand, Rod Stewart, Elton John, and many others, as well as feature films.

Biography

Personal life
Baskin was born to a Jewish family in Pasadena, California, to the Baskin-Robbins co-founder Burt Baskin and his wife Shirley Robbins (sister of co-founder Irv Robbins). His mother remarried to Isadore Familian. His sister Edie Baskin was a photographer for Saturday Night Live during the 1970s.

Baskin was in a relationship with Barbra Streisand from November 1983 to October 1987.

Career
Two years after Nashville was released, Baskin was the musical guest on the March 12, 1977, episode during the second season of Saturday Night Live with host Sissy Spacek.

In 1985, Baskin produced and arranged two tracks on Barbra Streisand's The Broadway Album. Baskin also wrote music for Welcome to L.A., Buffalo Bill and the Indians, or Sitting Bull's History Lesson, James at 16 and UFOria.

Footnotes

External links

1948 births
Living people
Songwriters from California
Jewish American songwriters
Writers from Pasadena, California
Baskin-Robbins family
21st-century American Jews